CFTV-DT, virtual channel 34.1 (UHF digital channel 30), is a low-powered community television station licensed to Leamington, Ontario, Canada. The station is owned by a local non-profit consortium known as Southshore Broadcasting. CFTV-DT's transmitter is located on South Talbot Road in Cottam, Ontario.

CFTV-DT's signal reaches as far as Harrow, Tilbury, and the village of South Woodslee in the town of Lakeshore. The station is available in the Leamington area on Cogeco digital cable channel 100 and Gosfield North IPTV channel 34, and nationwide on Bell Satellite TV channel 586. Currently, viewers in Windsor are unable to view the station as the over-the-air signal is too weak to be received in the city nor is the station available on cable.

History

The station was licensed by the Canadian Radio-television and Telecommunications Commission (CRTC) in 2003. On March 8, 2006, the Windsor Star stated that CFTV would begin regular transmissions on March 9, 2006, at 6:00 p.m. In the March 17, 2006 edition of the Windsor Star, it was confirmed that Leamington Municipal Council had allocated $12,000 per year to broadcast council meetings on the station.

Digital television
In replies to questions asked via email, the CRTC has stated that CFTV is not required to convert to digital, because it is a low-powered station fairly far from Windsor–Detroit, and thus, has not received a digital assignment and was not required to flash-cut on its current channel to digital operations on August 31, 2011.

On August 17, 2012, the CRTC approved the station's request to begin broadcasting in digital on its current channel, 34. In addition, the station has also received permission to carry four subchannels, making it the first station in Canada to launch original content on its multiplex channels.

References

External links
 
CFTV-TV history - Canadian Communication Foundation
 
 Tony Vidal interview on The Current

Canadian community channels
FTV-DT
FTV-DT
Leamington, Ontario
Television channels and stations established in 2005
Multicultural and ethnic television in Canada
2005 establishments in Ontario